Indina Bharatha (Kannada: ಇಂದಿನ ಭಾರತ) is a 1984 Indian Kannada film,  directed by  T. Krishna. The film stars Shankar Nag, Ambika, Mukhyamantri Chandru and Balakrishna in the lead roles. The film has musical score by Chakravarthy. The film was remake of Telugu film  Neti Bharatam (1983)

Cast

Shankar Nag
Ambika
Mukhyamantri Chandru
Balakrishna
Shakti Prasad
Lakshman
Dinesh
Vijayakashi
Ravichandra
Somu
Shashikala
Vijayaranjini
Rajya Lakshmi
Shanthamma
Ashalatha
Umesh
Guggu
Sadashiv Brahmavar
Mysore Lokesh

Soundtrack

Reception

References

External links
 

1984 films
1980s Kannada-language films
Kannada remakes of Telugu films